Mary Tracey-Purcell (born 22 May 1949) is an Irish middle-distance runner. She competed in the women's 800 metres at the 1972 Summer Olympics.

References

1949 births
Living people
Athletes (track and field) at the 1972 Summer Olympics
Athletes (track and field) at the 1976 Summer Olympics
Irish female middle-distance runners
Olympic athletes of Ireland
Place of birth missing (living people)